Leszek Pluciński (born 3 June 1990) is a Polish professional racing cyclist, who last rode for UCI Continental team .

Major results

2013
 5th Grand Prix Královéhradeckého kraje
 7th Memoriał Henryka Łasaka
2014
 2nd Race Horizon Park II
 6th Overall Tour de Serbie
 10th Grand Prix Královéhradeckého kraje
2015
 1st  Overall Bałtyk–Karkonosze Tour
 2nd Visegrad 4 Bicycle Race – GP Polski
2016
 6th Overall Bałtyk–Karkonosze Tour
 6th Coupe des Carpathes
 8th Korona Kocich Gór
2017
 2nd Overall CCC Tour - Grody Piastowskie
 5th Overall Bałtyk–Karkonosze Tour
2018
 4th Overall Czech Cycling Tour
 6th Overall Tour de Hongrie
 8th Overall Bałtyk–Karkonosze Tour
2019
 5th Overall Bałtyk–Karkonosze Tour

References

External links

1990 births
Living people
Polish male cyclists
People from Nysa, Poland
Sportspeople from Opole Voivodeship
21st-century Polish people